Ignacio Ratti (born April 5, 1994) is a Uruguayan footballer who plays for Huracán.

Career
Ratti started his senior career playing for River Plate (Uruguay) in 2014–2015 season. In 2011, he was enrolled in Uruguay national under-17 football team and played in the 2011 FIFA U-17 World Cup.

In 2019, Ratti joined Huracán FC.

References

1994 births
Living people
Uruguayan footballers
Club Atlético River Plate (Montevideo) players
C.A. Progreso players
El Tanque Sisley players
Huracán F.C. players
Association football midfielders
Uruguayan Primera División players
Uruguayan Segunda División players